Igor Zorčič (born 9 January 1978) is a Slovenian politician who has been Speaker of the National Assembly of Slovenia since 2020.

Biography
A lawyer by profession, Zorčič entered the Party of Miro Cerar in 2014 and was elected MP in 2014 and 2018. Following the restructuring of the cabinet after the resignation of Marjan Šarec as the Prime Minister in January 2020, Zorčič got elected Speaker of the National Assembly on 5 March 2020.

By the beginning of 2021, Zorčič left SMC. On 31 March 2021, SDS-led coalition tried to replace him as the Speaker of Assembly, but this attempt was unsuccessful.

References 

1978 births
Living people
Presidents of the National Assembly (Slovenia)
Modern Centre Party politicians